Khlong Muak Lek or Huai Muak Lek is a watercourse of Thailand. It is a tributary of the Pa Sak River, part of the Chao Phraya River basin.

Muak Lek